Tor André Grenersen (born 11 November 1969) is a retired Norwegian football goalkeeper.

He hails from Narvik and went through the ranks of FK Mjølner. The club had a short stint on the first tier, in the 1989 Norwegian First Division (the year before the league received the name Tippeligaen). He was also capped once during his spell at Mjølner. Later, in 1991, he joined first-tier club Tromsø IL. The club won the 1996 Norwegian Football Cup and famously beat Chelsea at home in the 1997–98 UEFA Cup Winners' Cup. Grenersen played for Tromsø until late 1997, when he retired.

He moved back to Narvik, and has among others served as youth coach and chairman in Mjølner.

References

1969 births
Living people
People from Narvik
Norwegian footballers
FK Mjølner players
Tromsø IL players
Norwegian First Division players
Eliteserien players
Norway under-21 international footballers
Norway international footballers
Association football goalkeepers
Sportspeople from Nordland